Anbar (also Romanized as ʿAnbar; also known as Anbal) is a village in Jahangiri Rural District, in the Central District of Masjed Soleyman County, Khuzestan Province, Iran. At the 2006 census, its population was 372, in 76 families.

References 

Populated places in Masjed Soleyman County